Nandlstadt is a municipality in the district of Freising in Bavaria in Germany. Nandlstadt is said to be the oldest hop-growing area in the world, having grown them since the year 860. The town lies in a triangle between Freising, Moosburg and Mainburg.

References

Freising (district)